"C" Is for (Please Insert Sophomoric Genitalia Reference Here) is an EP by the Maynard James Keenan side project Puscifer, which was released on November 10, 2009. It contains four previously unreleased songs as well as two tracks from "V" Is for Vagina recorded live on Puscifer's 2009 tour. "C" Is for (Please Insert Sophomoric Genitalia Reference Here) has sold 10,000 copies.

Release
Prior to the album's release, "The Mission" was released as a single. A video for the track was released in October, 2009. The track "Polar Bear" was streamed on the band's website and MySpace page in the weeks leading to release.

The release of the album itself followed on November 10, 2009 as a digital download only release on iTunes and Amazon.com.

A physical release of the EP was on September 7, 2010. The exclusive 12" vinyl features an additional two bonus tracks.

On May 30, 2020 a limited edition jigsaw puzzle of the EP cover was released to commemorate the panic buying of toilet paper which occurred during the COVID-19 pandemic.

Track listing

Digital download (2009)

Vinyl (2010)
Vinyl re-release with two bonus tracks.

Personnel
 Tim Alexander – drums
 Juliette Commagere – additional vocals, acoustic guitar
 Josh Eustis – piano, keyboards
 Jeff Friedl – drums
 Milla Jovovich – additional vocals
 Devo Keenan – additional vocals
 Maynard James Keenan – vocals
 Danny Lohner – programming
 Matt McJunkins – bass
 Mat Mitchell – bass, guitar, programming
 Tanya O'Callaghan – bass
 Jonny Polonsky – guitar, banjo, mandolin
 Carina Round – additional vocals
 Andy Savours – mixing
 Michael Patterson – mixing
 Gil Sharone – drums
 Rani Sharone – bass

References

Puscifer EPs
2009 EPs
Self-released EPs